Zygmunt Kalinowski (born 2 May 1949 in Laski) is a former Polish professional football goalkeeper.

Among the clubs he played for included Legia Warsaw, Śląsk Wrocław and Motor Lublin. He earned 4 caps for the Poland national football team, and was a reserve goalkeeper in the 1974 FIFA World Cup, where Poland finished third.

External links
 Zygmunt Kalinowski Stats at 90min
 Zygmunt Kalinosky Stats at StatsCrew

References

1949 births
Living people
Association football goalkeepers
Polish footballers
Polish expatriate footballers
Poland international footballers
1974 FIFA World Cup players
Legia Warsaw players
Motor Lublin players
Śląsk Wrocław players
People from Grójec County
Sportspeople from Masovian Voivodeship
Stal Kraśnik players
North York Rockets players
Canadian Soccer League (1987–1992) players
Polish expatriate sportspeople in Canada
Expatriate soccer players in Canada